Amylocorticiellum is a genus of fungi in the family Amylocorticiaceae. The genus has a widespread distribution and contains four species.

References

External links

Amylocorticiales